Kurmish may refer to:
 Kurmish, West Azerbaijan